Opsicarpium is a genus of flowering plants belonging to the family Apiaceae. It has only one species, Opsicarpium insignis. Its native range is Iran.

References

Apioideae
Monotypic Apioideae genera